Carter Island is a small, ice-covered island in Glade Bay, off the west side of Martin Peninsula, Bakutis Coast. It was mapped by the United States Geological Survey from surveys and from U.S. Navy air photos, 1959–66, and named by the Advisory Committee on Antarctic Names after Lieutenant G.W. Carter, U.S. Navy, maintenance coordinator at the Williams Field air strip on McMurdo Sound during Operation Deep Freeze 1966.

See also 
 List of Antarctic and Subantarctic islands

References
 

Islands of Marie Byrd Land